Amin Hassan Nasser (Arabic: أمين حسن الناصر‎) is the President and CEO of the Saudi Arabian oil company (Saudi Aramco), the world’s largest oil producer. He was acting president and chief executive until September 2015, when he assumed the position permanently.

Education 
Nasser holds a Bachelor's degree in petroleum engineering from the King Fahd University of Petroleum and Minerals in Dhahran. He completed the Saudi Aramco Management Development Seminar in Washington, D.C., in 1999; the Saudi Aramco Global Business Program in 2000; and the Senior Executive Program at Columbia University in 2002.

Career 
Nasser began his career with Saudi Aramco in 1982 as an engineer in the oil production department and proceeded to work in drilling and reservoir management. In 1997, he became manager of the Ras Tanura Producing Department. Later he became manager of the Northern Area Production Engineering Department, as well as the Safaniya Offshore and Onshore Producing Departments. He was appointed Chief Petroleum Engineer in 2004 and became Senior Vice President of Saudi Aramco’s Upstream operations in 2008.

Mr. Nasser, the fourth Saudi national to head Aramco, became acting President and CEO in May 2015, and was made permanent in September 2015.

As CEO, he led the company’s response to drone and missile attacks on its facilities in September 2019.

Prior to Aramco’s initial public offering (IPO), he led the company’s entry into the global debt and capital markets with its first bond issuance.

He oversaw Aramco’s 2019 IPO in which it become the world’s most valuable listed company, and led its 2020 acquisition of Saudi petrochemicals giant SABIC.

In July 2020, he received the ICIS Kavaler Award, which recognizes outstanding achievement in petrochemicals. 

In 2021, amid growing pressure for fossil fuel companies to become greener to contribute to climate change mitigation, Nasser warned countries against disinvesting in fossil fuels, arguing that it would cause inflation and cause unrest.

Other affiliations 

Nasser is a member of the Society of Petroleum Engineers (SPE). He has served on SPE's Industry Advisory Council since 2008. He is a member of the International Advisory Board (IAB) of the  KFUPM and the Board of Trustees of the King Abdullah University of Science and Technology (KAUST).

He is also a member of the World Economic Forum’s International Business Council, the JPMorgan International Advisory Council, and the MIT President CEO Advisory Board.

References 

King Fahd University of Petroleum and Minerals alumni
Living people
Saudi Arabian chief executives
20th-century Saudi Arabian engineers
1960 births
People from Qatif
20th-century Saudi Arabian  businesspeople
21st-century Saudi Arabian  businesspeople